Galt is a community in Cambridge, Ontario, Canada, in the Regional Municipality of Waterloo, Ontario on the Grand River. Prior to 1973, it was an independent city, incorporated in 1915, but amalgamation with the town of Hespeler, Ontario, the town of Preston, Ontario and the village of Blair formed the new municipality of Cambridge. Today it is also known as Downtown Cambridge. The first mayor of Cambridge was Claudette Millar.

There was considerable resistance among the local population to this "shotgun marriage" arranged by the provincial government and a healthy sense of rivalry had always governed relations among the three communities. Even today, many residents refer to their area of Cambridge as being Galt or Preston or Hespeler. Each unique centre has its own history that is well documented in the Cambridge City Archives.

No current population data is available for the former Galt since the Census reports cover only the full area of Cambridge.

The former Galt covers the largest portion of the amalgamated municipality, making up the southern half of the city. It is located on the Grand River and has a very long history as an industrialized area. The former Preston and Blair are located on the western side of the city, while the former Hespeler is in the most northeasterly section of Cambridge.

History

In the late 1700s, developers began to buy land around the Grand River from the Six Nations Indians who were led by Joseph Brant. One speculator, William Dickson, a wealthy immigrant from Scotland, bought  of land along the Grand River in 1816; this was later to become Galt and the Dumfries Townships. Dickson divided the land and advertised in Scotland for immigrants; many were attracted and arrived in what is now Galt, primarily from Roxburghshire and Selkirkshire. Dickson sold lots to these new settlers. The centre of the planned community was at the junction of Mill Creek and the Grand River, then called Shade's Mills.

Absalom Shade, a carpenter from Pennsylvania, was hired in 1816 by William Dickson to manage his lands in Dumfries Township. He later operated a general store, a mill and a distillery in Shade's Mills, which later became Galt. In 1819, he built a small bridge over the Grand River to serve customers on the other side; it lasted until 1832. Shade also supplied food and built roads for the Canada Company. He helped establish the Grand River Navigation Company to help transport goods along the river, as well as the Gore Bank in Hamilton. Shade also helped develop railways in the area and was among those who built Galt's Trinity Anglican Church in 1844.

Dickson decided to name the Post Office Galt, in honour of John Galt of the Canada Company which was developing this entire area. Primarily agricultural in early years, Galt had attracted industry by 1840 and became the largest town in the Grand River area until the early 1900s. Galt was incorporated as a village in 1850, as a town in 1857 and as a city in 1915. Throughout that entire period, it continued to grow based on a large industrial base.

The Canadian Gazetteer of 1846 discussed the community's water power which was essential to power the local industries which were making the area prosperous. At the time the population was about 1000, most originally from Scotland. There were five churches, a weekly newspaper, a fire department, a public library, a bank and a curling club. The post office received mail every day. Industries already in operation included "two grist mills (each containing four run of stones), two saw mills, two foundries, two carding machines and cloth factories, one brewery, two distilleries, one tannery..." A foundry had also opened on Grand Avenue, initially as Dumfries Foundry which would later become Goldie & McCulloch, a major manufacturer of safes, wood working machinery and engines powered by steam or by gasoline. It would continue as a major operation under several other owners until 2000.

The largest of the early schools in the community, the Galt Grammar School, opened in 1852 with William Tassie as headmaster starting in 1853 at the site of what later became the Galt Collegiate. The school gained widespread recognition and attracted students from across North America. By 1872, it had been recognized as a Collegiate Institute.

Galt incorporated as a town on January 1, 1857, with Morris C. Lutz elected as the first mayor. By 1858, a "Town Hall and Market House" had been built with an "Italianate", particularly Tuscan, influence. In later years, the Town Hall became the City Hall and was extensively modified. Galt was incorporated as a city in 1915.

The population in 1869 was 4000 and the community was said to be one of the principal manufacturing locations in Ontario. The railway reached Galt in 1879, increasing the opportunities of exporting local goods and importing others. In 1889, the former Dickson Mill on the Grand River was converted to a hydro electric plant which operated until July 1911 when a power grid from Niagara Falls reached the community.

In the early 1870s, the Credit Valley Railway planned to implement several lines running west and north from Toronto and in 1873, built freight and passenger buildings in Galt. By 1879, the company had installed a bridge crossing the river and in December completed a preliminary test run with a train; it was successful. The CVR venture was not long-lived however, and in 1883, the line was taken over by the Canadian Pacific Railway which built a brick passenger building that still stands.

A new streetcar system, the Galt, Preston and Hespeler electric railway, (later called the Grand River Railway Company) would begin operation in 1894, connecting Preston and Galt. In 1911, the line reached Hespeler, Berlin (later called Kitchener) and Waterloo; by 1916 it had been extended to Brantford/Port Dover. The electric rail system ended passenger services in April, 1955.

Not long after Galt had become part of Cambridge, in May 1974, flooding on the Grand River filled city streets with water to a depth of about four feet. In some areas of the downtown core, the depth was 17.4 feet, smashing windows and carrying goods along the streets. Approximately 75 businesses were affected, with virtually none covered by relevant insurance. The flood caused an estimated $5 million in damage.

The Dickson Hill Heritage Conservation District, also known as Old West Galt, is an affluent neighbourhood full of stately homes from the late 19th and early 20th centuries, found on the western side of the Grand River in West Galt.

Government
The local government is the Cambridge City Council consisting of a mayor and eight councillors, each representing a ward. The mayor is Katheryn McGarry (2018-2022 term) and formerly (2014-2018 term) was Doug Craig.

Cambridge is also represented on the higher-tier Waterloo Regional Council which consists of the Regional Chair, the Mayors of the seven cities and townships, and eight additional Councilors - four from Kitchener and two each from Cambridge and Waterloo. Ken Seiling has held the position of Regional Chair since 1985.

Cambridge is represented in Ottawa by Bryan May (Liberal), the federal member of Parliament who defeated the previous incumbent MP (Gary Goodyear, Conservative – 2004 to 2015) in the October 2015 election.

The MPP for Cambridge is Belinda Karahalios of the New Blue Party of Ontario, who was first elected to this position in 2018.

Municipal services
Galt was an independent city in Waterloo County, Ontario until 1973 when amalgamation created the Regional Municipality of Waterloo. At that time, Galt was amalgamated into the new city of Cambridge. The Region handles many services, including Police, waste management, community health, transit, recreation, planning, roads and social services.

The Region consists of the cities of Cambridge, Kitchener, and Waterloo, and the townships of Woolwich, Wilmot, Wellesley, and North Dumfries.

Public transportation
Since 2000, local and regional transit throughout the Region of Waterloo has been provided by Grand River Transit (GRT), which was created by a merger of the former Cambridge Transit and Kitchener Transit.

GRT operates a number of routes in Cambridge, four of which travel outside of the city: presently the 52, 61, and 72 buses run to southern Kitchener.

The Ainslie St. Transit Terminal in Galt was the southern terminus of GRT's original iXpress route (later rebranded as the 200 iXpress after the addition of more routes), which ran through all three cities in the Region of Waterloo before terminating in the north at the Conestoga Mall terminal (later renamed Conestoga station) in Waterloo. The route was launched in 2005 as a part of the Regional Growth Management Strategy, which called for greater densification of urban cores, and was considered an intermediary step while more long-term rapid transit plans were still maturing.

In June 2009 Regional Council voted to approve a plan to construct a light rail line, which has been named
the Ion rapid transit. The first phase would run from Conestoga Mall in the north of Waterloo, to Fairview Park Mall in the south of Kitchener, while the second phase of the line would run from Fairview Mall to the Galt area of Cambridge. Mayor Doug Craig was a determined opponent of the plan, arguing that an expanded express bus system would be just as effective but much less expensive. By late February 2017, the Kitchener-Waterloo portion was well into the final phase of construction, but plans for the Cambridge section of the LRT were still in the very early stage. Public consultations were just getting started at the time. Three routes had been agreed on in 2011, with eight "endorsed" stops: at Fairway, Sportsworld, Preston, Pinebush, Cambridge Centre Mall, Can-Amera, Delta and Ainslie Street Terminal. Three others were still being considered.

As the launch of light rail service approached, Grand River Transit began to lay the groundwork for the transition from iXpress to Ion service by renaming the 200 iXpress to the 200 iXpress/ION Bus Rapid Transit. On Monday, 24 June 2019, three days after the launch of Ion light rail between Conestoga station in Waterloo and Fairway station in Kitchener, the 200 iXpress route was discontinued. Its southern section running through Cambridge was replaced with the 302 ION Bus route, terminating in the north at Fairway station, with riders able to continue on the light rail system as a linear transfer. As of June 2019, the Region of Waterloo planned for the 302 ION Bus to ultimately be replaced by an extension of the light rail line to Galt.

Education

Public English-language schooling is provided by the Waterloo Region District School Board, which operates 26 elementary and five secondary schools in Cambridge. The most notable high school is the Galt Collegiate Institute and Vocational School, which is over 150 years old.

Publicly funded Catholic education is available through schools operated by the Waterloo Catholic District School Board.

The University of Waterloo School of Architecture campus is located in Cambridge in the Riverside Silk Mill, also known as the Tiger Brand Building. Inside there is a theatre, a fitness room, and the gallery "Design at Riverside", which is one of two publicly funded galleries dedicated to architecture in Canada. The School of Architecture is home to 380 students who live, study, and learn within the Cambridge community.

Notable people
 Margaret Avison, poet
 Florence Carlyle, artist
 Mike Moffat, ice hockey goaltender
 Georgina Fraser Newhall, writer
 Gord Renwick, ice hockey administrator 
 Ron Shaver, figure skating champion

See also

 Grand River Railway
 Grand River Transit
 Grand Trunk Railway
 Great Western Railway
 Haldimand Proclamation
 Highway 401
 Quebec City–Windsor Corridor
 Regional Municipality of Waterloo
 Speed River

References

Citations

Bibliography

Further reading
  
 
 

Cambridge, Ontario
Historic districts in Canada
Populated places on the Grand River (Ontario)
Populated places disestablished in 1973
1973 disestablishments in Ontario